Grand Ayatollah Mirza Javad Gharavi Aliari Tabrizi (1935-2018) was an Iranian Twelver Shi'a Marja. He was born in Tabriz, Iran. He migrated to Najaf to study in Grand Ayatollah al-Khoei's seminaries. He was close to Iranian reformists.

Death
Grand Ayatollah Gharavi Alliari died on 6 September 2018 at the age of 83.

See also

Grand Ayatollahs
Lists of Maraji
List of Ayatollahs

References

People from Tabriz
1935 births
2018 deaths
Iranian grand ayatollahs